Nasir ad-Din al-Qasri Muhammad ibn Ahmad, also Nasir al-Qasiri, was the young son of the Sultan of Fez, Sultan Ahmad.

Life 
In 1545, his father Sultan Ahmad was taken prisoner by his southern rivals the Saadians. His successor, Ali Abu Hassun, regent for Nasir al-Qasiri, decided to pledge allegiance to the Ottomans in order to obtain their support.

He ruled with a regent from 1545 to 1547 during the imprisonment of his father by the Saadians.

Notes

Sultans of Morocco
16th-century Berber people
16th-century monarchs in Africa
Wattasid dynasty